Zoran Roglić (born 16 May 1976) is a Croatian former football defender who played in the Croatian Second Football League, Croatian First Football League, and the Canadian Soccer League.

Career 
Roglić began his career in 1998 in the Croatian Second Football League with RNK Split. The following season he signed with NK Mosor, and in 2004 he signed with HNK Hajduk Split of the Croatian First Football League, where he won the Croatian Championship in the 2004-05 season. During his time in the First Division he also played with HNK Šibenik and featured in 54 matches and recorded two goals. In 2010, he went overseas to Canada to sign with Brantford Galaxy of the Canadian Soccer League. Midway through the season he returned to Croatia to play with Mosor. He finished off his career in the Croatian Second League with NK Mladost Proložac, and NK Zagora Unešić.

References

External links
 

1976 births
Living people
Footballers from Split, Croatia
Association football defenders
Croatian footballers
RNK Split players
NK Mosor players
HNK Hajduk Split players
HNK Šibenik players
Brantford Galaxy players
NK Zagora Unešić players
First Football League (Croatia) players
Croatian Football League players
Canadian Soccer League (1998–present) players
Croatian expatriate footballers
Expatriate soccer players in Canada
Croatian expatriate sportspeople in Canada